Underbelly is an Australian television true crime-drama series which first aired on the Nine Network on 13 February 2008 and last aired 1 September 2013. Each series was based on real-life events. There have been six series in total.

Series overview

Episodes

Series 1: Underbelly (2008)

Series 2: A Tale of Two Cities (2009)

Series 3: The Golden Mile (2010)

Series 4: Razor (2011)

Series 5: Badness (2012)

Series 6: Squizzy (2013)

Ratings

See also

Telemovies 
 Underbelly Files: Tell Them Lucifer was Here
 Underbelly Files: Infiltration
 Underbelly Files: The Man Who Got Away
 Underbelly Files: Chopper

Spin-offs 
 Underbelly NZ: Land of the Long Green Cloud
 Fat Tony & Co.
 Informer 3838

References

Underbelly
Underbelly
Australian crime-related lists